Pfeiffer Big Sur State Park is a state park in Monterey County, California, near the area of Big Sur on the state's Central Coast. The park is centered on the Big Sur River. It has been nicknamed a "mini Yosemite." A Redwood tree in the park nicknamed the Colonial Tree is estimated to be between 1,100 and 1,200 years old.

History

Native Americans
The Esselen people were the first known residents of the Big Sur area. They lived in the area from about Point Sur south to Big Creek, and inland including the upper tributaries of the Carmel River and Arroyo Seco watersheds. Archaeological evidence shows that the Esselen lived in Big Sur as early as 3500 BC, leading a nomadic, hunter-gatherer existence. The aboriginal people inhabited fixed village locations, and followed food sources seasonally, living near the coast in winter to harvest rich stocks of otter, mussels, abalone, and other sea life. In the summer and fall, they traveled inland to gather acorns and hunt deer.

The native people hollowed mortar holes into large exposed rocks or boulders which they used to grind the acorns into flour. These can be found throughout the region. Arrows were of made of cane and pointed with hardwood foreshafts. The tribes also used controlled burning techniques to increase tree growth and food production. Based on baptism records in the Spanish mission system and population density, their population has been estimated to have been from 1,185-1,285. Their population was limited in part due to inaccessible nature of the Santa Lucia Mountains. They were and are one of the least numerous indigenous people in California. By about 1822, much of the California Indian population in proximity to the missions had been forced into the mission system.

European homesteaders

The first known European settler in Big Sur was John Davis, who in 1853 claimed a tract of land along the Big Sur River. He built a cabin near the present day site of the beginning of the Mount Manuel Trail. In 1868, Native Americans Manual and Florence Innocenti bought Davis' cabin and land for $50.

Pfeiffer family 

Sébastien Pfeiffer (born in Dolving, Moselle, Lorraine, France, in 1794) and his wife, Catherine Vetzer (born in Haut-Clocher, Moselle, Alsace-Champagne-Ardenne-Lorraine, in 1795), were married in 1819. Around 1830, they and their five children immigrated to St. Clair County, Illinois. Their son Michael (born on September 18, 1832) and two brothers, Joseph, and Alexander, left Illinois during the California Gold Rush for the gold fields of Sierra County, California, near the border with Nevada.

Michael Pfeiffer returned to Illinois and married sixteen-year-old Barbara Laquet on April 14, 1859.  A few months later they  joined a wagon train which followed the Butterfield Overland Stage route from St. Louis, Missouri, west to California. Michael brought several brood mares with him. They rejoined his brothers Joseph and Alexander and grew wheat in northern California. Then they rented a farm in Solano County, where  Vacaville is now located.  Their sons Charles and John were born there in 1860 and 1862 and their daughter Mary Ellen was born in 1866. When the owner raised their rent, they were forced to leave.  While living in Tomales Bay, they learned that much of the good arable land in California had been claimed. But a neighbor told them that to the south of Rancho El Sur in a place known as Pacific Valley there remained good grazing land. They knew the Homestead Act of 1862 allowed them to file a land patent for a five-dollar fee.

The ship carried up to 345 passengers. It was struck by a raging storm while at sea, causing waves to break over the deck. When they arrived at Monterey after two days, their mother was so sick she could not walk. The Pfeiffer family was fortunate to get off the ship in Monterey. All of the passengers and crew were saved, but the ship and its cargo were a total loss.

On October 14, 1869, after traveling for four days, they had traveled about  down the rugged coast. They passed through the Cooper Ranch and the Molera Ranch. One of their sons became sick. Unsure how many more days of it would take to reach Pacific Valley, they decided to stop and rest for a few days. They traveled south about 6 more miles until they found a clearing in present day Sycamore Canyon, where they camped for several nights.

They liked the area so much they decided to wait for spring before moving south. By then they found the area so favorable that they decided to stay put. They had four more children: William, Frank, Flora, and Adelaide. Michael built a small cabin of hand-split redwood north of the mouth of Sycamore Canyon. He filed for patents on his land in 1883 and 1889. 

The Pfeiffer home became well known among travelers along the coast, and when the number of guests grew, in 1908 the Pfeiffer Ranch Resort became the first formal lodging along the coast when they began charging guests. The location is now the site of the Big Sur Lodge. It competed with the Hotel Idlewild on the banks of the Little Sur River for customers.

Michael's son John and his wife Florence Zulema built their own cabin on the north bank of the Big Sur River in 1884. In 1930, John Pfeiffer was offered $210,000 (or about  $ today) for his land by a Los Angeles developer who intended to build a subdivision. Pfeiffer wanted to preserve the land he and his family had grown to love, and instead sold  to the state of California in 1933. Pfeiffer Big Sur State Park is named after John Pfeiffer and his family. Several features in Big Sur are named for the descendants of the Pfeiffer family: Pfeiffer Beach, Pfeiffer Falls Trail, Pfeiffer Big Sur State Park, and Julia Pfeiffer Burns State Park.

Boy Scout camp

In 1934, the Monterey Bay Area Council built a makeshift Camp Wing within the park, but it was abandoned after the 1937 summer camping season. The next year the Boy Scouts built Camp Esselen at another location within the park. This site was improved until 1945, when limitations of the site, closeness to public camping facilities, and jurisdictional conflicts between the Scouts and the state forced the council to request reimbursement from the state for $8,000 in improvements. The council continued to use the camp until 1953. In 1952, the Scouts began building Camp Pico Blanco, and when that camp was opened in 1954, Camp Esselen was finally closed.

Overnight stays
Pfeiffer Big Sur State Park has both a hotel (the Big Sur Lodge) and a campground within its boundaries. The campgrounds were closed in the winter of 2008–2009 due to the Basin Complex Fire. The campgrounds have coin-operated showers, bathrooms and a convenience store. The convenience store also offers WiFi access.

Hiking
Pfeiffer Big Sur State Park is known for its redwood groves and trail to Pfeiffer Falls. Mud slides caused by the Basin Complex fire necessitated rerouting the Pfeiffer Falls Trail, re-opened 13 years later in 2021.

Fire impact 
Pfeiffer Big Sur State Park was damaged by the Basin Complex Fire during June and July 2008, which burned  in California. Much of the damage was to the outskirts of the park, however, and the campgrounds were able to reopen at the end of July. The Chalk Fire of September and October, which burned an additional , did serious damage to Pfeiffer Big Sur State Park, which was largely closed from September 2008 to May 2009.

References

External links 
 

State parks of California
1933 establishments in California
Coast redwood groves
Parks in Monterey County, California
Protected areas established in 1933
Santa Lucia Range
Big Sur
Protected areas of Monterey County, California